Prince M. Bunyamin Air Force Base is a military airport in Astra Ksetra, Lampung, Indonesia.

References

Airports in Sumatra